Abacetus ituriensis is a species of ground beetle in the subfamily Pterostichinae. It was described by Straneo in 1956.

References

ituriensis
Beetles described in 1956